Carlos Pimiento (born 15 October 1968) is a Colombian retired footballer.

He played as a forward for Colombian sides Deportes Tolima and Deportivo Cali, before he moved abroad along Bernardo Redín nd joining PFC CSKA Sofia becoming the two pioneer Colombian players in Bulgaria.

References

Colombian footballers
Living people
Association football forwards
1968 births
PFC CSKA Sofia players
Expatriate footballers in Bulgaria